The men's tournament of basketball at the 2015 Summer Universiade in Gwangju began on July 4 and ended on July 13.

Teams

Note
 The United States was represented by the University of Kansas.

Preliminary round

Group A

|}

Group B

|}

Group C

|}

Group D

|}

Classification rounds

Quarterfinal round

17th–24th place

9th–16th place

Semifinal round

21st–24th place

17th–20th place

13th–16th place

9th–12th place

5th–8th place

Final round

21st place game

19th-place game

17th-place game

15th-place game

13th-place game

11th-place game

9th-place game

7th-place game

5th-place game

Championship playoffs

Quarterfinals

Semifinals

Bronze-medal game

Gold-medal game

Final standings

References

Basketball - Men's
Men's
2015 Summer Universiade